Peter Vandermeer (born October 14, 1975) is a Canadian former professional ice hockey left winger, currently playing in the senior men's Chinook Hockey League with the Innisfail Eagles. Undrafted, Vandermeer played in two National Hockey League (NHL) games during the  season for the Phoenix Coyotes. He appeared with the Coyotes after signing with them mid-season on February 8, 2008, this after playing as the enforcer for their AHL affiliate, the San Antonio Rampage. He played in 15 professional seasons, primarily in the American Hockey League. He is the older brother of fellow NHL player Jim Vandermeer.

Career statistics

References

External links

1975 births
Living people
Abbotsford Heat players
Anaheim Bullfrogs players
B.C. Icemen players
Buffalo Wings (inline hockey) players
Canadian ice hockey left wingers
Canadian people of Dutch descent
Columbus Chill players
Grand Rapids Griffins players
Hamilton Bulldogs (AHL) players
Hershey Bears players
Ice hockey people from Alberta
Philadelphia Phantoms players
Phoenix Coyotes players
Providence Bruins players
Quad City Flames players
Red Deer Rebels players
Richmond Renegades players
Rochester Americans players
San Antonio Rampage players
Sportspeople from Red Deer, Alberta
Trenton Titans players
Undrafted National Hockey League players
Utah Grizzlies (ECHL) players
Victoria Salmon Kings players
Wilkes-Barre/Scranton Penguins players